The 1950 Wimbledon Championships took place on the outdoor grass courts at the All England Lawn Tennis and Croquet Club in Wimbledon, London, United Kingdom. The tournament was held from Monday 26 June until Saturday 8 July. It was the 64th staging of the Wimbledon Championships, and the third Grand Slam tennis event of 1950.

For the first time since the 1927 introduction of seedings 16 players were seeded in the men's singles event instead of eight. Budge Patty and Louise Brough won the singles titles.

Finales

Seniors

Men's singles

 Budge Patty defeated  Frank Sedgman, 6–1, 8–10, 6–2, 6–3

Women's singles

 Louise Brough defeated  Margaret duPont, 6–1, 3–6, 6–1

Men's doubles

 John Bromwich /  Adrian Quist defeated  Geoff Brown /  Bill Sidwell, 7–5, 3–6, 6–3, 3–6, 6–2

Women's doubles

 Louise Brough /  Margaret duPont defeated  Shirley Fry /  Doris Hart, 6–4, 5–7, 6–1

Mixed doubles

 Eric Sturgess /  Louise Brough defeated  Geoff Brown /  Pat Todd, 11–9, 1–6, 6–4

Juniors

Boys' singles

 John Horn defeated  Kamel Moubarek, 6–0, 6–2

Girls' singles

 Lorna Cornell defeated  Astrid Winther, 6–2, 6–4

References

External links
 Official Wimbledon Championships website

 
Wimbledon Championships
Wimbledon Championships
Wimbledon Championships
Wimbledon Championships